Frédéric Gauthier (born 27 September 1975 in Vernon, Eure) is a French sprint canoer who competed in the early 2000s. At the 2000 Summer Olympics in Sydney, he was eliminated in the semifinals of the K-4 1000 m event.

References
 

1975 births
Living people
People from Vernon, Eure
Canoeists at the 2000 Summer Olympics
French male canoeists
Olympic canoeists of France
Sportspeople from Eure